inkl is a bundled news service. inkl was founded in 2014 by Gautam Mishra.

It provides access to bundled news sources for a fixed monthly fee.

References

Subscription services
Internet properties established in 2014
2014 establishments in Australia
Australian news websites